Stadler FLIRT (Fast Light Intercity and Regional Train) is a passenger multiple unit trainset made by Stadler Rail of Switzerland. The baseline design of FLIRT is an electric multiple unit articulated trainset that can come in units of two to twelve cars with two to six motorized axles.

The FLIRT train was originally developed for the Swiss Federal Railways and was first delivered in 2004. The trains quickly became a success and were ordered by operators in Algeria, Azerbaijan, Belarus, the Czech Republic, Estonia, Finland, Germany, Hungary, Italy, the Netherlands, Norway, Poland, Serbia, Slovenia, Sweden, Switzerland, the United Kingdom, the United States, and, most recently (2018), Canada. As of October 2021, more than 2500 units have been sold.

Other than electric (EMU), the FLIRT is produced in diesel-electric version (DEMU), and recently also as electro-diesel (bi-mode/BMU), first ordered by the Aosta Valley region in Italy (BTR.813), and then by Greater Anglia (British Rail Class 755), Norske Tog, and Wales & Borders ("tri-mode" version: diesel/overhead electric/battery).

Specifications 
The FLIRT is a new generation of multiple units, even though it has a striking resemblance with GTW vehicles. The trains can have two to six sections and electric variants are available for all commonly used power supply systems (AC and DC) as well as standard and broad gauge. It has Jacobs bogies shared between the individual coaches, with wide walk-through gangways. The floor height at the entrances can be chosen by the operator, providing level boarding at most stations. Automatic couplers of either Schwab type (on all Swiss units) or Scharfenberg type at both ends of the train allow up to four trains to be connected.

All FLIRT variations use IGBT-based traction converters from ABB, which drive the TSA induction motors located in the two bogies at either end of the train. On the two-section trains, only one bogie is powered, while on longer versions it is possible to have a third powered bogie in the middle, found on the trains for Vy in Norway and for PKP Intercity in Poland.

The diesel version is essentially an electric version with a diesel power module inserted, generating electricity for the electric motors. In TEXRail application, the diesel power module contains two 520 kW (697 hp) Deutz AG TCD 16.0 V8 that complies with US EPA Tier 4 emission standard.

Diesel, bi-mode electro-diesel, hybrid diesel-battery, or battery versions are essentially baseline design with an additional one-third length non-passenger car inserted in the trainset – called a PowerPack car – which contains the electricity generating and storage components, such as diesel engines and batteries, that provide electricity to the train to run "off-wire". It has a gangway through the centre to allow passengers to pass between the two parts of the train.

Operators

Algeria
On 18 March 2006, the Algerian operator SNTF announced that it had ordered 64 four-car EMUs for suburban services in Algiers. The trains were delivered between 2008 and 2010.

Azerbaijan
In November 2019, it was announced that Azərbaycan Dəmir Yolları (Azerbaijan Railways) had placed a €115 million order for ten Russian gauge Stadler FLIRT units in various configurations, for delivery to start taking place in 2022.

The order specification is as follows:
 3x EMU for suburban trains
 3x EMU for regional trains
 4x DMU for regional trains

Because the Azerbaijan Railway is currently converting the electrification voltage of many lines on its network from 3 kV DC to 25 kV AC, the diesel fleet will be introduced first, allowing the service to be upheld during this conversion process.

Belarus
Ten Russian gauge units were delivered to the Belarusian Railways in 2011. Six more were delivered from 2013 to 2014.

The trains are mostly used on various suburban routes around Minsk, such as Minsk-Pasažyrski to Minsk National Airport. The Stadler FLIRT trains are also used as inter-regional transport in Belarus, on the routes Minsk–Homieĺ, and Minsk–Brest.

Two Stadler FLIRT units with an interior optimised for longer distance (EPm-class) were delivered to Belarus in 2015 to 2016, and in January 2019, ten more of these trains were ordered for delivery in 2020.

Canada 

On 3 May 2018 it was announced that the city of Ottawa would be purchasing 7 diesel-electric FLIRT trains to use on its upgraded and extended Trillium Line. The trains started tests for service in January 2022.

Czech Republic

The Czech private operator LEO Express ordered 5 units. Units are modified as InterCity trains. All 5 units have operated on the Prague–Ostrava line since December 2012. Since December 2013 one unit is operated on the Prague–Staré Město u Uherského Hradiště and since December 2014 next one unit is operated on the international route Prague–Košice (Slovak Republic).

Estonia

Elron ordered 18 electric (6 4-car and 12 3-car) and 20 diesel (6 4-car, 8 3-car and 6 2-car) broad-gauged trains. By June 2014 all 38 trains were delivered. This has been the first time FLIRT DMUs were produced. First 5 trains went into service on 1 July 2013 and by January 2014 all old trains were replaced by the new ones. On 16 April 2014 one of the new DMUs that had been operating for just 5 months had an accident near Raasiku (truck collision). The unit was badly damaged. It will go back into service by 2015 when the two damaged carriages will be replaced with new ones.
In November 2014, Elron initiated an investigation into suspected flaws in some diesel trains. Two different build flaws were found in many of the trains and faulty components were replaced under warranty.

Finland

81 4-section  broad-gauged FLIRT units, classified as Sm5 in the Finnish system, have been ordered by Pääkaupunkiseudun Junakalusto Oy (a joint venture between the cities of Helsinki, Espoo, Vantaa and Kauniainen) for service on the Helsinki commuter rail network. The Sm5 units are leased by Pääkaupunkiseudun junakalusto to the Helsinki Regional Transport Authority, but they are currently operated by the VR Group. The initial order in 2006 was for 32 trainsets. 9 further units were ordered in 2011 and 34 further units in 2014.

The first Sm5 unit arrived in Finland on 11 November 2008. Following preliminary testing the first unit was displayed to the public in Helsinki on 17 December 2008. During the remainder of on 2008 and for most of 2009 the Sm5 units were extensively tested in different parts of Finland. The first unit entered passenger service on 18 November 2009.

Germany

The Cantus Verkehrsgesellschaft, a joint subsidiary of Hessische Landesbahn and Hamburger Hochbahn, became the first German FLIRT operator when they received their first train in 2006. Their fleet consists of 14 three-car and 6 four-car units.

Since December 2007 Abellio Rail NRW has operated 9 3-car and 8 2-car FLIRT trains for regional routes between Essen, Hagen, Iserlohn and Siegen. This was the first time that a FLIRT with only two sections was ordered.

Also since December 2007 WestfalenBahn uses 14 3-car and 5 five-car trains for trains services in the Teutoburg Forest region.

In 2006 DB Regio, a subsidiary of Deutsche Bahn ordered 5 5-section vehicles for regional services on the German east coast. The trains were delivered in August 2007 and, until December 2019, were used on the routes Rostock–Stralsund–Lietzow–Sassnitz (Hanse-Express), Sassnitz–Stralsund and Binz–Lietzow. Since October 2020, they run the RB17 (Wismar – Ludwigslust).

The biggest order from Germany so far came in October 2006 from the leasing company Angel Trains Europa when they ordered 25 4-car FLIRT trains. All 25 units have been leased to Eurobahn who uses them on the Hellweg Network in North Rhine-Westphalia. Only a year later, in November 2007, Angel Trains ordered 4 more four-car and 14 five-car trains that will also be used by Eurobahn. In 2017, Eurobahn also took over the WestfalenBahn operation of the Teutoburger-Wald-Network, taking over 18 FLIRT 1 units, as well as ordering 8 new FLIRT 3 units.

On the InnoTrans 2008, a trade fair focused on rail transport, Vias announced their order for 12 four-section and 7 three-section units. Starting in December 2010, the trains were put on the Frankfurt–Koblenz route. The same year, the Hessische Landesbahn (HLB) started to operate 3 three- and 5 six car FLIRT units on the Frankfurt – Gießen – Siegen line.

Starting in December 2013, the Bayerische Oberlandbahn, called Bayerische Regiobahn (BRB) since 2020, uses 3 three car and 28 six car FLIRTs for their Meridian services, which run between Munich-Salzburg and Kufstein. Since August 2014, the ownership of the trains was transferred to AlphaTrains, only to be leased back for the Meridian.

From December 2014 on, the RE 1 (Koblenz – Trier (– Luxembourg /) – Saarbrücken – Ludwigshafen – Mannheim), RE 2 (Koblenz – Frankfurt), RE 4 (Frankfurt (Main) – Mainz – Ludwigshafen – Karlsruhe), RE 14 (Frankfurt (Main) – Mainz – Ludwigshafen – Mannheim), are operated with FLIRT 3 units, with the RE 1 being coupled with a CFL-operated KISS between Trier and Koblenz.

Go-Ahead Germany ordered 45 units in 2016 for delivery in 2019.

Transdev ordered 64 3-car units in November 2018, planned to enter service in 2021 on Hanover S-Bahn lines. In June 2019, Transdev subsidiary NordWestBahn awarded Stadler a €100m order to supply 16 Flirt electric multiple-units for the Bremen/Niedersachsen S-Bahn services. The trains will enter service starting December 2022.

In July 2019, Schleswig-Holstein rail authority NAH.SH awarded Stadler a €600m order for 55 battery-powered Flirt Akku multiple unit trains along with maintenance for 30 years. The trains, which offer of battery range, will start entering service in 2022 and replace DMUs on non-electrified routes.

Hungary

 Hungarian State Railways operates 60 units (deliveries between 2007 and 2010). Technical details: single voltage 25 kV, maximum speed 160 km/h, four section trains with 200+11 (folding) seats, up to 3 trains can be connected together. Red-black-white livery.
 Győr–Sopron–Ebenfurth railway (in 2012 ordered 4 units, delivery until Q2 2014. First 2 units arrived on 6 December 2014 and started their public service on 15 December of the same year.)
 Hungarian State Railways (in 2013 ordered further 42 units, delivery until Q3 2015). The first 2 units arrived on 27 February 2014 and the first one presented to the public at Kápolnásnyék on 19 March. New units have arrived in new livery of blue and white colour scheme with yellow doors instead of the previous red and white one. 
 Győr–Sopron–Ebenfurth railway (in 2013 ordered further 6 units, delivery until Q3 2015)
 Hungarian State Railways (in July 2015 ordered further 21 units, delivery until Q4 2016). The first unit arrived on 11 September 2015 These four section units have the same blue and white colour scheme with yellow doors which is the same as the 2013 orders livery.
 Győr–Sopron–Ebenfurth railway in September 2016 ordered further 10 units (the first order of the new FLIRT 3 version, delivery until Q1 2019)

Hungary has the largest fleet of Stadler Flirt EMU trains. MÁV operates 123 units, while GYSEV operate 20 units from this series. (2020)

It's planned that the first 60 units will be equipped with ETCS L2 signaling, control and train protection system, while all newer units are already equipped with ETCS L2. The units will also receive the blue and white colour scheme.

Italy
In Italy FLIRT are used by 6 regional railways, in total units ordered and built are so divided among the following companies:

Ferrovie del Gargano: name ETR 330, single voltage to 3 kV DC, maximum speed . Fleet: three units.

Ferrotramviaria: name ETR 340, single voltage to 3 kV DC, maximum speed . Fleet: four units.

SAD used on Val Pusteria Railway name ETR 155 and ETR 170. C.a dual voltage 15 kV AC / 3 kV DC. Fleet: 4 units (ETR 155) and 6 units (ETR 170), In July 2011 have been ordered 8 new units for routes within the jurisdiction of SAD. Now there are (2020) 8 Flirt dual voltage 001-008 (005-008 ex ETR 155) and 24 ETR 170.1/.2 dual / tri voltage (3 kV DC / 15 kV AC / 25 kV 50 Hz)

Sistemi Territoriali: name ETR 340, single voltage to 3 kV DC, maximum speed  [10]. Fleet: 2 units from 2008, 4 and 16 FLIRT ordered in 2009. The FLIRT ordered in 2009 will be built in conjunction with the AnsaldoBreda: the Stadler Rail will carry vehicles head of convoys, systems of traction and onboard auxiliary, the bogies and bearing while AnsaldoBreda realize intermediate cars, the staging and the final composition of the train and the delivery to the operators at the plant in Pistoia.

Tilo (Switzerland / Italy): RABe 524/ETR 150 C.a dual voltage 15 kV AC / 3 kV DC. Maximum speed . The first 19 units of this type to be delivered were 4 sections long, and were followed by 11 units ordered that 6 sections long and are additionally equipped with the ETCS Level 2 train control system.

Ferrovie Emilia Romagna: 12 units, in conjunction with the construction AnsaldoBreda: the Stadler Rail will carry out the head of the convoys of vehicles, systems, traction and onboard auxiliary, engines and carriages bearing while AnsaldoBreda carry out intermediate cars, the staging and the final composition of the train and the delivery to the operators at the plant in Pistoia.

Valle d'Aosta region (licensed to Trenitalia): BTR 813, EMU-DMU tractions, maximum speed  [Electric] -  [Diesel]

Netherlands

On 23 April 2015 the Netherlands' railway operator Nederlandse Spoorwegen announced that it was ordering 58 Stadler FLIRT EMUs, comprising 25 4-car units and 33 3-car units, to be delivered by the end of 2016. The very short delivery deadline (20 months), to meet capacity needs, allowed NS to invoke 'urgency mode' provisions in EU procurement rules and place the order without tendering. The 58 FLIRT EMUs for NS were produced at Stadler's plant in Siedlce, Poland, 92 km east of Warsaw, following the order which that plant completed for PKP Intercity in Poland. Meanwhile, Arriva Nederland also ordered two- and three-car units for operation in the province of Limburg.

, FLIRT 2, 3 and 4 EMUs are in service in the Netherlands with the following operators:
Arriva
Connexxion
Nederlandse Spoorwegen (some of them with R-net branding)
Keolis

Norway

50 Flirt units were ordered by Vy (formerly Norwegian State Railways (NSB)), with a further 100 on option. 26 units were placed on the Oslo Commuter Rail and the remaining 24 units were used on regional and express routes. During spring and summer 2012 all Flirt trains used by Vy were fitted with free wireless Internet access for the passengers. In the Vy's system, the FLIRT trains are classified as "Class 74" for regional trainsets and "Class 75" for local trainsets.

All trains have 5 cars. Trial runs started on the Bergen Line in 2009, using a SBB-CFF-FFS unit. The first units were scheduled to enter passenger service on 29 February 2012. The FLIRT's introduction was delayed after a unit derailed during tests by NSB on 15 February 2012, injuring five people. The train had much too high speed and there were no safety systems along the railway that could catch the driver's error.

The first train entered into regular service on 2 May 2012 on the line from Skien to Lillehammer. The last of the 50 trains was delivered on 24 January 2014. Vy has ordered a further 57 trains, for a total of 107, as of October 2015. In 2017 an order for additional 18 was placed, current total is 125, with 40 short regional trains, and the rest as the local commuter train. In July 2018, a total of 100 trains have been delivered, 36 short regional and 64 local commuter trains.

Local class 75 trains are configured with 5 seats (2+3) abreast. The class 74 regional trains were also delivered with 2+3 seating on regional trains except in the premium "Komfort" section that had 2+2 seating. Significant passengers complaints over cramped seating led Vy to reconfigure the regional trains into 2+2 seating during 2014.

These fleets have  floor without steps. Since many Norwegian platforms are too low to access to these fleets, they will have to be raised to  platform height to be accessible. These fleets cannot operate for low platform lines (e.g. Bergen Line, Sørlandet Line west of Kongsberg, Dovre Line north of Lillehammer). Raised platforms will be matched with conventional train steps, hence vertical gaps between this fleet and platforms will remain.

In 2018 the last options were used, which includes 25 trainsets, most of which include the Class 75 and 74 that are set to operate on Gjøvikbanen and Vossebanen.

The two last are bi-mode/hybrid trains named Class 76. These are similar to the FLIRT 3's owned by Greater Anglia in the UK will have an extra carriage for diesel generators, in order to operate fully electric on electrified parts of the railway and diesel supported by batteries on tracks without wires.

In total 14 trainsets of the bi-modal type 76 will be delivered to serve the Trønder Commuter Rail as well as the Meråker and Røros Lines. These will replace the aging Class 92's built by Duewag which are fully diesel. All this is included Bane Nor's (Norway's Rail Management Agency) and Jernbaneverkets plan to finally modernize the Trøndelag Railways, which have outdated buildings and infrastructure. These lines are also already partially electrified (between Støren and Trondheim), and are planned to be further electrified in stages.

November 2022 the final 150th train set was delivered.

In February 2023 Norway ordered 17 FLIRT NEX long-distance trains, with the option of up to 100 train sets. These trains are planned to enter testing in 2025 and service on the Bergen Line in 2026, replacing end of life train sets on the line. These will be classified as "Class 79" and have 8 wagons including reclining seats, flexible sleeping compartments that can be used as private seating areas during daytime use, bistro, and a family area.

Poland

Koleje Mazowieckie in 2008 bought 10 4-car 3 kV DC (class ER75) units for services in the Warsaw region.
Koleje Śląskie (KŚ) bought 4 4-car 3 kV DC units (class EN75) for service in Silesia. Łódzka Kolej Aglomeracyjna (ŁKA) in 2012 ordered 20 2-car FLIRT3 units for service in the region around Łódź, for delivery by February 2015. 
PKP Intercity in August 2013 ordered 20 8-car 3 kV DC FLIRT3 units (class ED160) with interiors for long-distance travel and top speed of 160 km/h (99 mph), for service on four long-distance routes in Poland, from a consortium of Stadler Polska and Newag for delivery by October 2015. In 2018 Koleje Mazowieckie started another order of total 61 5-car 3 kV DC FLIRT3 units (class ER160) in 5 batches slated for deliveries from 2020 to 2022. In 2019 PKP Intercity ordered further 12 8-car 3 kV  DC FLIRT3 units for deliveries through 2023.

Portugal
The order of 22 trains comprises 10 electric units (EMU) and 12 bimodal units (BMU). They will consist of 3 aluminium car-bodies with a maximum capacity for 375 passengers, 214 of them seated, with one additional generator car in bimodal units. These trains can reach a maximum speed of 160 respectively 140 kilometres per hour, depending on the power source used. Delivery is expected for late 2024.

Serbia

Serbian Railways have ordered 21 FLIRT3 EMUs for regional traffic and were delivered in 2014 and 2015. In 2022 further 18 units were ordered with deliveries expected to start from 2023. Trains are numbered ŽS 413/417.

Slovenia

Slovenian Railways ordered 11 235-passenger FLIRT EMUs (SŽ 510/515) and 5 171-passenger DMUs (SŽ 610/615) in April 2018, for delivery by early 2020 and exercised an option for a further 10 EMUs and 16 DMUs in May 2019 for delivery by late 2021, bringing the total order up to 21 4-car EMUs and 21 3-car DMUs. Together with 10 Stadler KISS units there are 52 Stadler trainsets in Slovenia as of October 2022.

Spain
The 100 m variants will consist of two single-deck FLIRT end cars connected to two bilevel KISS intermediate cars, while the 200 m variants will feature additional two single-deck FLIRT intermediate cars.

Sweden
MTRX ordered six Flirt EMUs for inter-city operation between Stockholm and Gothenburg. They are very similar to the Norwegian units, maximum 200 km/h, but have more comfortable seats aimed for longer distances, and a small café area. The first unit was delivered in November 2014. They started customer operation in March 2015.

Transitio in 2014 signed an agreement with Stadler, CAF and Bombardier, that these three companies are chosen to get orders for regional and local trains during 2015–2021. Transitio is a train purchasing company owned by the regional transport authorities in Sweden. The rolling stock chosen was ER1 which was delivered from 2020.

Switzerland
The Swiss Federal Railways were Stadler's first customer for the FLIRT when they ordered 42 units with options for 100 more in September 2002. The first vehicle was delivered in 2004 for the use on the Stadtbahn Zug.

Meanwhile, the Swiss Federal Railways have ordered a total of 117 units that can be broken down into 4 different types that differ in their equipment for driving in neighboring countries. The base version is the RABe 523 that is used on the Stadtbahn Zug and the RER Vaud. These 43 4-section units can only be used within Switzerland. The 30 RABe 521 and 14 RABe 522 are versions that can also be used in Germany and France respectively. They also consist of 4 sections and are used on the Basel S-Bahn. The last version is the Italy-capable RABe 524/ETR 150 that is used on Treni Regionali Ticino Lombardia (TILO) services in Ticino and northern Italy. The first 19 units of this type to be delivered were 4 sections long, and were followed by eleven units ordered that six-sections long and are additionally equipped with the ETCS Level 2 train control system.

In December 2018, SBB ordered 7 trains, with an option of 7 more. They will be manufactured 2019–2021. Each train has four single-deck cars, with a total of 27 seats in first class and 154 in second class. The SBB name is 'Mouette' (Seagull).

Besides the Swiss Federal Railways two other companies in Switzerland operate FLIRT trains: The Südostbahn (SOB) uses several trains with the designation RABe 526 (FLIRT and FLIRT-III, including the Traverso used as Voralpen Express, Treno Gottardo, and Aare-Linth). The Transports Publics Neuchâtelois (TransN) owns 3 RABe 527 and 4 RABe 523 trains.

BLS AG ordered 58 6-car EMU sets in May 2017 for service on RegioExpress and Bern S-Bahn routes, with delivery scheduled to take place between 2021 and 2026.

United Kingdom

In August 2016 Greater Anglia selected Stadler FLIRT electric and bi-mode units for the East Anglia franchise to replace its Class 90 electric locomotives, Mark 3 carriages and Driving Van Trailers, Class 153, 156 and 170 diesel multiple units, and Class 379 electric multiple units. This comprised 14 3-car and 24 4-car bi-mode multiple units (Class 755) and 20 12-car electric multiple units (Class 745) (of which 10 will be used for Stansted Express and 10 for Intercity services).

In June 2018, KeolisAmey Wales announced it would purchase 35 FLIRT trains: 24 tri-mode (seven 3-car and 17 4-car) Class 756 units and 11 4-car diesel-electric Class 231 units for the South Wales Metro.

United States

On 9 June 2015 Trinity Metro signed a contract for the supply of eight 4-car articulated FLIRT3 diesel-electric multiple units for the TEXRail commuter line, which opened in January 2019. The contract was signed at a ceremony held at Fort Worth Central Station. The contract is valued at $107 million, and includes the supply of components for 10 years. The contract also includes an option for an additional 24 DMUs. This is Stadler's first order for its FLIRT family in the US (previous orders have been for the GTW), and the first to include federal funding and thus be subject to the Buy America Act. As such, one element of the contract is that the final assembly of the trains will take place in the US, and several assembly sites such as in Lewisville were considered for the facility. Stadler eventually leased space from the Utah Transit Authority in their former Union Pacific shops in Salt Lake City, Utah.

Public unveiling events for the completed American-built FLIRT units occurred in both Atlanta, Georgia on 9 October 2017 and Salt Lake City, on the Salt Lake, Garfield and Western Railway, on 13 October 2017 as Stadler broke ground for their permanent Salt Lake facility.

Three 2-car FLIRT sets were built for Arrow service in Redlands, California, which started operation in 2022. The $31.4 million contract includes the vehicles themselves, spare parts, and training for servicing and operation. In November 2019, the San Bernardino County Transportation Authority ordered an additional FLIRT powered via hydrogen fuel cell, the first such train in the United States. In September 2022, an order of four additional hydrogen-powered trains were announced by Stadler and CalSTA for Amtrak California inter-city services.

Eight 4-car sets are to enter service with Dallas Area Rapid Transit on the Silver Line when it opens in 2024.

Potential operators

Philippines
The Department of Transportation (DOTr) is procuring 56 airport express EMU cars for its North–South Commuter Railway project, which will be operated by the Philippine National Railways (PNR). Bids commenced on 15 October 2021 with three contractors offered their proposed designs. One of the three bidders is Japanese firm Marubeni who partnered with Stadler Rail and formed their own joint venture. The venture proposes a high-floor variant of the FLIRT200. It will also run on standard gauge track and will use 1.5 kilovolt DC power.

If this bid succeeds, manufacture will also coincide with the completion of Stadler/INKA plant in Banyuwangi, Indonesia. The trains are expected to be supplied between 2023 and 2027, entering trial service between Clark International Airport and Buendia station by 2026.

Cancelled contracts

Latvia
On 1 July 2014 Latvian rail operator Pasažieru vilciens announced that it would acquire FLIRT trains as part of a hire/purchase contract, however Pv owner Latvian Railways ultimately withdrew the contract and no procurement went ahead.

Accidents and incidents
On 15 February 2012, a FLIRT unit used for tests and driver education, without passengers, derailed near Holmestrand in Norway, injuring five people. The train driver was convicted of negligence but given a conditional discharge by the court who also faulted the lack of safety systems that could catch the driver's error.
On 16 April 2014, a FLIRT operated by Elron heading from Tallinn to Tartu was involved in an accident in Raasiku. A dump truck hit the third wagon at a level crossing, causing multiple wagons to derail. One female passenger aged 43 was killed, 12 people received injuries. The dump truck driver, a man aged 59, received fatal injuries. The damaged units were repaired and resumed service.
On 5 November 2014, a FLIRT operated by SNTF derailed in Hussein-Dey, on the eastern suburb of Algiers in Algeria, it was heading to Thenia, 50 kilometers from the capital, the train was supposed to be commuted to a passing loop at 150m from Hussein-Dey train station to allow the fast Algiers-Oran to overtake, because the latter isn't programmed to stop at that station, the train derailed on the switch at a higher speed than limited, the accident killed a 55-year-old woman and injured 70, according to the local authorities.
On 16 May 2015, a FLIRT operated by WestfalenBahn was involved in a collision on a level crossing at Ibbenbüren, North Rhine-Westphalia, Germany. Two people were killed and twenty were injured. The train was scrapped.
On 9 February 2016, two FLIRTs operated by the Bayerische Oberlandbahn were involved in a head-on collision near Bad Aibling, Germany. 11 people were killed, 80 were injured.
On 12 July 2016, a FLIRT was involved in a head-on collision at Andria, Apulia, Italy that killed 23 people.
On 5 June 2017, a FLIRT operated by Leo Express ignored a stop signal and crashed into a buffer stop at Přerov, Czech republic. 18 people were injured including staff.
Despite emergency braking, the train was unable to stop before the crossing. A collision was avoided by half a second. The Rail Accident Investigation Branch has opened an investigation into the incident. In response, Greater Anglia has imposed a  speed restriction over five level crossings on the Bittern Line.

Fleet details

See also
Alstom Coradia
Siemens Desiro
Bombardier Talent 2
Bombardier Aventra
CAF Civity

Sources
 Official Website Flirt160
 Official Website Flirt200
 Old
 Description of the SBB variants from Bruno Lämmli (in German)
 German language version in November 2009
 Spec Sheet for SBB Variant; French
SOB Rolling Stock

References

External links

 FLIRT160 (regional version) at Stadler website
 FLIRT200 (long-distance version) at Stadler website
 Stadler Flirt @ Trainspo

Stadler Rail multiple units
74
Multiple units of Switzerland
Electric multiple units of Poland
Train-related introductions in 2004
Passenger trains running at least at 200 km/h in commercial operations
25 kV AC multiple units
15 kV AC multiple units
1500 V DC multiple units